Alessandro is both a given name and a surname, the Italian form of the name Alexander. Notable people with the name include:

People with the given name Alessandro

 Alessandro Allori (1535–1607), Italian portrait painter
 Alessandro Baricco (born 1958), Italian novelist
 Alessandro Bega (born 1991), Italian tennis player
 Alessandro Bordin (born 1998), Italian footballer
 Alessandro Botticelli (1445–1510), Italian painter
 Alessandro Bovo (born 1969), Italian water polo player
 Alessandro Cagliostro (1743–1795), alias of occultist and adventurer Giuseppe Balsamo
 Alessandro Calcaterra (born 1975), Italian water polo player
 Alessandro Calvi (born 1983), Italian swimmer
 Alessandro Cattelan (born 1980), Italian television preesenter
 Alessandro Cortini (born 1976), Italian musician
 Alessandro Criscuolo (1937–2020), Italian judge
 Alessandro Del Piero (born 1974), Italian footballer
 Alessandro Di Munno (born 2000), Italian footballer
 Alessandro Evangelisti (born 1981), Italian footballer
 Alessandro Fontana (1936–2013), Italian academician and politician
 Alessandro Grandi (1586–1630), Italian composer
 Alessandro Hojabrpour (born 2000), Canadian soccer player
 Alessandro Juliani (born 1978), Canadian actor
 Alessandro Lindblad (Alesso) (born 1991), Swedish musician, DJ and producer
 Alessandro Manzoni (1785–1873), Italian poet and novelist
Alessandro Martelli (1876–1934), Italian academic and politician
 Alessandro Martini (1812–1905), Italian businessman and founder of Martini & Rossi distillery
 Alessandro Matri (born 1984), Italian footballer
 Alessandro de' Medici, Duke of Florence (1510–1537), ruler of Florence from 1530 to 1537
 Alessandro Murgia (born 1996), Italian footballer
 Alessandro Mori Nunes (born 1979), Brazilian footballer
 Alessandro Nannini (born 1959), Italian racing driver
 Alessandro Nesta (born 1976), Italian footballer
 Alessandro Nivola (born 1972), American actor
 Alessandro D'Ottavio (1927–1988), Italian boxer
 Alessandro Pagani (born 1937), Italian Roman Catholic bishop
 Alessandro Petacchi (born 1974), Italian professional road cyclist
 Alessandro Pezzatini (born 1957), Italian race walker
 Alessandro Piccolo (agricultural scientist) (born 1951), Italian scientist
 Alessandro Riggi (born 1993), Canadian soccer player
Alessandro Ruben (born 1960), Italian politician
 Alessandro Safina (born 1963), Italian tenor
 Alessandro dos Santos (born 1977), Brazilian and naturalised Japanese footballer
 Alessandro Scarlatti (1660–1725), Italian composer
 Alessandro Viana da Silva (born 1982), Brazilian footballer
 Alessandro Stratta (born 1964), celebrity chef
 Alessandro Sturba (born 1972), Italian footballer
 Alessandro Serenelli, criminal, gardener, porter and layman
 Alessandro Tiarini (1577–1668), Italian painter
 Alessandro Trentacinque (1541–1599), Italian writer and jurist
 Alessandro Emanuele "Alex" Treves (1929–2020), Italian-born American Olympic fencer
 Alessandro Venturella (born 1984), British musician
 Alessandro Volta (1745–1827), Italian physicist
 Alex Zanardi (born 1966), Italian racing driver

People with the surname Alessandro
 Danilo Alessandro (born 1988), Italian footballer
 Jonatan Alessandro (born 1987), Argentine footballer
 Victor Alessandro (1915–1976), American orchestra conductor

Italian masculine given names
Sammarinese given names